The Devon Rugby Football Union is the governing body for the sport of rugby union in the county of Devon in England. The union is the constituent body of the Rugby Football Union (RFU) for Devon, and administers and organises rugby union clubs and competitions in the county. It also administers the Devon county rugby representative teams.

History 
The first rugby team representing Devon was formed in 1877 but was solely a team with no organisation role. The Devon RFU was formed, as the Devon County Football Association, in 1881. Devon were the first opponents of The Original All Blacks during their famous 1905-6 tour. They lost 55–4.

Devon senior men's county side

The Devon senior men's county side currently play in the Bill Beaumont Division 1 South.  Historically, they are one of the strongest counties in the competition having won it multiple times although they have not won a trophy since 2007.

Honours:
County Championship Cup winners (10): 1899, 1901, 1906, 1907, 1911, 1912, 1957, 2004, 2005, 2007

Affiliated clubs
There are currently 49 clubs affiliated with the Devon RFU, most of which have teams at both senior and junior level.  The majority of teams are in Devon but a couple are based in Cornwall.

Barnstaple
Bideford
Brixham
Buckfastleigh Ramblers
Crediton
Cullompton
Dartmouth
Devonport HSOB
Devonport Services
Exeter Chiefs
Exeter Engineers
Exeter Saracens
Exeter University
Exeter Youth (juniors only)
Exmouth
Honiton
Ilfracombe
Ivybridge
Kingsbridge
New Cross
Newton Abbot
North Tawton
Okehampton
Old Plymothian & Mannamedian
Old Technicians
Paignton
Peninsula Medical School
Plymouth Albion
Plymouth Argaum
Plymouth University
Plympton Victoria
Plymstock Albion Oaks
Salcombe
Saltash 
Sidmouth
South Molton
St Columba & Torpoint 
Tamar Saracens
Tavistock
Teignmouth
Tiverton
Topsham
Torquay Athletic
Torrington
Totnes
University of St Mark & St John
Wessex
Withycombe
Westcountry Wasps

County club competitions 

The Devon RFU currently runs the following competitions for club sides based in Devon:

Leagues

Tribute Cornwall/Devon (alongside Cornwall RFU) - league ranked at tier 8 of the English rugby union system for clubs that are based in either Cornwall or Devon
Devon League 1 - tier 9 league for Devon clubs

Cups

Devon Senior Cup - founded in 1888, open to clubs at tiers 5 of the English rugby union system
Devon Shield - founded in 2018, open to clubs at tier 6
Devon Intermediate Cup - founded in 2009, open to clubs at tiers 7-8
Devon Junior Cup - founded in 1932, open to clubs at tiers 9-10
David Butt Memorial Trophy - founded in 2016, pre-season cup for clubs at tiers 9-10

Discontinued competitions

Havill Plate - knockout cup competition that ran between 1971 and 1999.  Initially, for sides knocked out of early rounds of the Devon Senior Cup but would later expand to also include clubs knocked out the Junior Cup
Devon League 2 - tier 10 league that ran between 1987 and 2018.
Devon League 3 - tier 11 league that ran between 1996 and 2003.

Notes

See also
South West Division
English rugby union system

References

External links 
Devon RFU website

Rugby union governing bodies in England
1881 establishments in England
Rugby union in Devon